Erik Johnsen (born 4 July 1965) is a Norwegian former ski jumper.

Career
His best-known successes were at the 1988 Winter Olympics, where he earned two medals, with a silver in the large hill event and a bronze in the team event. Johnsen also won the ski jumping competition at the Holmenkollen ski festival in 1988. His career ended due to problems in adjusting from the Daescher technique to the V-style in 1991.

World Cup

Standings

Wins

References

 

1965 births
Living people
Norwegian male ski jumpers
Ski jumpers at the 1988 Winter Olympics
Olympic ski jumpers of Norway
Olympic silver medalists for Norway
Skiers from Oslo
Olympic medalists in ski jumping
Medalists at the 1988 Winter Olympics
Olympic bronze medalists for Norway
20th-century Norwegian people